Gerhard Pfanzelter (born 1943) is an Austrian diplomat. He served as the Permanent Representative of Austria to the United Nations between 7 September 1999 and November 2008. In 2000 he served as Vice-President of the Economic and Social Council of the United Nations, and in 2002 he became Vice-President of the 57th United Nations General Assembly. During the first half of 2006 he chaired the European Union in New York during Austria's Presidency of the Council of the European Union.

Pfanzelter spent a year as an exchange student in at Elk River High School in Elk River, Minnesota with  AFS Intercultural Programs.

He has a law degree from the University of Innsbruck and a M.A. in International Relations from Johns Hopkins University's School of Advanced International Studies.

Pfanzelter successfully led Austria's campaign for a non-permanent seat on the Security Council for the period 2009–2010.

Previously, from 1983 to 1989, Pfanzelter had served as Austria's Ambassador to Senegal, Gambia, Cape Verde, Guinea-Bissau, Mali, Guinea and Mauritania. He then became the Ambassador to Syria for a four-year term, ending in 1993, when he became the Head of the Department for International Organizations of the Austrian Ministry for Foreign Affairs.

Pfanzelter is the longest serving Austrian Permanent Representative at the United Nations. From 2010 to 2012, he served as Secretary-General of the Central European Initiative in Trieste.

Pfanzelter is member of the board of the Foreign Policy and United Nations Association of Austria (UNA-AUSTRIA).

Pfanzelter is President of the Vienna International School Association in Vienna and resigned after just 10 Month in 2020.

Notes

1943 births
Living people
Austrian politicians
Austrian diplomats
Ambassadors of Austria to Syria
Permanent Representatives of Austria to the United Nations
Paul H. Nitze School of Advanced International Studies alumni
University of Innsbruck alumni